Little Mother is a 1929 Our Gang short silent comedy film directed by Robert F. McGowan. Produced by Hal Roach and released to theaters by Metro-Goldwyn-Mayer, Little Mother was the 87th Our Gang short to be released. A silent film, it followed Our Gang's first sound film, Small Talk, on the release schedule.

Cast

The Gang
 Joe Cobb as Joe
 Jean Darling as Jean
 Allen Hoskins as Farina
 Bobby Hutchins as Wheezer
 Mary Ann Jackson as Mary Ann
 Harry Spear as Harry
 Donnie Smith as Beezer
 Pete the Pup as himself

Additional cast
 Charlie Hall as Taxi driver
 Charles Millsfield as Bearded man
 Warner Richmond as Father
 Gene Stone as Skinny man who gets showered
 Lyle Tayo as Mother/Aunt
 Ed Brandenburg as Bit

See also
 Our Gang filmography

References

External links

1929 films
1929 short films
American silent short films
American black-and-white films
1929 comedy films
Films directed by Robert F. McGowan
Hal Roach Studios short films
Our Gang films
1920s American films
Silent American comedy films